Marguerite Wolff (10 December 1883 – 21 May 1964) was a British legal scholar of Jewish descent.

She was born Marguerite Jolowicz in London. Her brother was the Roman law scholar Herbert Felix Jolowicz. In 1906 she married Martin Wolff, a law professor at the University of Berlin.

From January 1925 to March 1933 she was employed at the Kaiser Wilhelm Institute for Foreign Public Law and International Law, first as an unofficial co-director and then as a research scholar. She also translated publications on English and American law. She later served as a librarian of the institute. When the Nazi Party came to power in April 1933, she was immediately removed from her position at the institute and returned to Great Britain. Her husband followed in the autumn of 1938. Wolff continued to provide translation for legal works. She had also served as translator at The Hague after World War I and was chief translator at the Nuremberg trials.

Wolff died in a London nursing home at the age of 80.

Her son Konrad became a famous pianist.

References 

1883 births
1964 deaths
English legal scholars
German legal scholars
English translators
English Jews
Lawyers from London
20th-century British translators
20th-century English lawyers